Images is the fourth album led by saxophonist Ralph Moore which was recorded in 1989 and released on the Landmark label.

Reception 

In his review on AllMusic, Scott Yanow stated "The particularly strong material and the all-star lineup make this a particularly enjoyable set from the tenorman. Although still displaying the inspiration (soundwise) of early-'60s John Coltrane, Moore had developed an increasingly original style within the modern mainstream throughout the 1980s ... One of Ralph Moore's more significant recordings to date".

Track listing 
All compositions by Ralph Moore except where noted
 "Freeway" – 8:04
 "Enigma" (J. J. Johnson) – 5:29
 "Episode from a Village Dance" (Donald Brown) – 7:37
 "Morning Star" (Rodgers Grant) – 8:31 Additional track on CD reissue	
 "This I Dig of You" (Hank Mobley) – 5:36
 "Blues for You" – 5:04
 "Punjab" (Joe Henderson) – 6:59
 "One Second, Please" (Elmo Hope) – 5:01

Personnel 
Ralph Moore – tenor saxophone
Terence Blanchard – trumpet (tracks 1, 3, 5 & 7)
Benny Green – piano
Peter Washington – bass 
Kenny Washington – drums

References 

Ralph Moore albums
1989 albums
Landmark Records albums
Albums recorded at Van Gelder Studio
Albums produced by Orrin Keepnews